Twilight of the Gods is an original novel written by Christopher Bulis and based on the long-running British science fiction television series Doctor Who. The novel features the Second Doctor, Jamie and Victoria. It is a sequel to the 1965 serial The Web Planet.

Plot
Much time has passed since the Doctor's first visit to the Web Planet, and he returns to find a very different world: it's in the middle of an interplanetary war between opposing factions in a divided people. To restore peace, the Doctor must resolve an ideological conflict, solve the paradox of life on Vortis, and finally, face the ones called ´Gods of Light´.

References

External links
The Cloister Library - Twilight of the Gods

1996 British novels
1996 science fiction novels
Virgin Missing Adventures
Second Doctor novels
Novels by Christopher Bulis
Novels set on fictional planets